The Lake Fork West Owyhee River is a short tributary of the West Little Owyhee River in the U.S. state of Oregon. The river begins near Cat, Bend, and Pedroli springs near the eastern boundary of the Fort McDermitt Indian Reservation in southern Malheur County. It flows generally northeast to meet the larger river in Louse Canyon. The Lake Fork has no named tributaries.

See also
 List of rivers of Oregon

References

External links
Owyhee Watershed Council

Rivers of Oregon
Owyhee River
Rivers of Malheur County, Oregon